Clifford Hubbard (1911–1962) was an English footballer who played for Hull City and West Ham United in the Football League.

References

1911 births
1962 deaths
English footballers
Association football forwards
Scunthorpe United F.C. players
Hull City A.F.C. players
West Ham United F.C. players
Goole Town F.C. players
Worksop Town F.C. players
English Football League players